Julius Masvanise (born February 7, 1966) is a retired male track and field athlete from Zimbabwe, who competed for his native African country at the 1996 Summer Olympics in Atlanta, Georgia. Masvanise was a hurdler and a sprinter.

References

External links

1966 births
Living people
Zimbabwean male hurdlers
Zimbabwean male sprinters
Olympic athletes of Zimbabwe
Athletes (track and field) at the 1996 Summer Olympics
African Games bronze medalists for Zimbabwe
African Games medalists in athletics (track and field)
Athletes (track and field) at the 1995 All-Africa Games